The 2008 Kentucky Republican presidential primary took place on May 20, 2008. The only Republican candidates that were still in the race were Senator John McCain and Congressman Ron Paul. McCain was the presumptive Republican nominee, having already won enough delegates to secure his eventual nomination.  McCain won the primary.

Results

* Candidate dropped out of the race before the primary

See also
 Kentucky Democratic primary, 2008
 Republican Party (United States) presidential primaries, 2008

References

Kentucky
Kentucky Republican presidential primaries
2008